Landon is a personal name of English origin that means "long hill". It is a variant of Langdon. Landon became popular in the United States in the 1990s, and by 2010 had become the 32nd most popular name for boys.

Notable people with the given name "Landon" include

A
Landon Ashworth (born 1984), American actor

B
Landon Bow (born 1995), Canadian ice hockey player
Landon Brown (born 1987), American politician
Landon Bussie (born 1988), American basketball coach

C
Landon Carter (1710–1778), American planter
Landon Carter (of Cleve) (1751–1811), American planter
Landon Cassill (born 1989), American stock car driver
Landon Cider, American drag king
Landon T. Clay (1926–2017), American businessman
Landon Cohen (born 1986), American football player
Landon Collins (born 1994), American football player

D
Landon Deireragea (born 1960), Nauruan politician
Landon Dickerson (born 1998), American football player
Landon Donovan (born 1982), American soccer player

F
Landon Ferraro (born 1991), Canadian ice hockey player
Landon Fox, American football coach

G
Landon Garland (1810–1895), American academic administrator

H
Landon Carter Haynes (1816–1875), American politician
Landon Huffman (born 1996), American stock car racing driver

J
Landon Johnson (born 1981), American football player
Landon Jones (born 1943), American editor

L
Landon Liboiron (born 1990), Canadian actor
Landon Ling (born 1987), Hong Kong-Canadian footballer

M
Landon Mackenzie (born 1954), Canadian artist
Landon Milbourne (born 1987), American basketball player

N
Landon Curt Noll (born 1960), American computer scientist

P
Landon Parvin (born 1948), American speechwriter 
Landon Pearson (born 1930), Canadian politician
Landon Pembelton (born 2005), American stock car racing driver
Landon Pigg (born 1983), American musician
Landon Powell (born 1982), American baseball player

R
Landon Rice (born 1988), Canadian football player
Landon Ronald (1873–1938), English conductor
Landon T. Ross Jr. (1942–2016), American environmental biologist
Landon H. Rowland (1937–2015), American businessman

S
Landon Sexton (born 1941), Canadian politician
Landon Sims (born 2001), American baseball player

T
Landon Addison Thomas (1799–1889), American politician
Landon Trusty (born 1981), American football player
Landon Turner (born 1993), American football player
Landon Turner (basketball) (born 1960), American basketball player

W
Landon Wilson (born 1975), American ice hockey player

Y
Landon Young (born 1997), American football player

Notable people with the surname "Landon" include

A
Alf Landon (1887–1987), American politician

B
Bruce Landon (born 1949), Canadian ice hockey player

C
Charles Landon (disambiguation), multiple people
Christopher Landon (disambiguation), multiple people

D
Dena Landon (born 1977), American author

E
Edward Ruggles Landon (1813–1883), American politician
Eric Landon (born 1976), Danish-American artist

F
Felicity Landon, English journalist
Francis G. Landon (1859–1947), American soldier and politician
Fred Landon (1880–1969), Canadian journalist

H
Hal Landon Jr. (born 1941), American actor
H. C. Robbins Landon (1926–2009), American musicologist
Herman Landon (1859–1948), British general
Hugues Landon (born 1930), French equestrian

J
Jennifer Landon (born 1983), American actress
John Landon (disambiguation), multiple people
Jon Landon (born 1979), Canadian football player
Judy Landon (born 1928), American actress

K
Kenneth Landon (1903–1993), American missionary

L
Lara Landon (born 1985), American musician
Larry Landon (born 1958), Canadian ice hockey player
Laurene Landon (born 1957), American actress
Leslie Landon (born 1962), American actress
Letitia Elizabeth Landon (1802–1838), British writer
Lorraine Landon (born 1947), Australian basketball administrator
Louis Landon, American composer

M
Margaret Landon (1903–1993), American novelist
Mark Landon (1948–2009), American actor
Melville D. Landon (1839–1910), American journalist and humorist
Michael Landon (1936–1991), American actor
Michael Landon Jr. (born 1964), American actor

N
Neil Landon (1941–2020), English singer

P
Perceval Landon (1868–1927), British writer

R
Richard Landon (born 1970), British footballer
Richmond Landon (1898–1971), American athlete

T
Timothy Landon (1942–2007), British soldier and politician
Tina Landon (born 1963), American choreographer
Truman H. Landon (1905–1986), American air force general

W
Whittington Landon (1758–1838), English academic administrator

Fictional characters
Jodie Landon, a character on the television series Daria

References

English masculine given names